Szestno  is a village in the administrative district of Gmina Mrągowo, within Mrągowo County, Warmian-Masurian Voivodeship, in northern Poland.

The village has a population of 830.

References

Castles of the Teutonic Knights
Villages in Mrągowo County